Purdown (sometimes spelt Pur Down) is a hill in the north east of Bristol, England.  The suburb of Lockleaze lies on its western flanks, and the Stoke Park estate occupies its eastern flanks.  The M32 motorway crosses the eastern side of the hill.

The Purdown BT Tower is constructed near the highest point of the hill.

Hills of Bristol